Sam Anderson is an American author, who is a staff writer at The New York Times Magazine and the author of Boom Town, a book about Oklahoma City. In 2017, he won a National Magazine Award for his article about Michelangelo's David. Prior to this, he was a book critic for the magazine New York . In 2007 he received the Balakian Award for Excellence in Criticism from the National Book Critics Circle.

Anderson holds a master's degree from Louisiana State University.

In his free time, Anderson likes to read voraciously and has taken up a hobby of drawing. He often shares his drawings on his instagram page.

Works
Boom Town: The Fantastical Saga of Oklahoma City, its Chaotic Founding... its Purloined Basketball Team, and the Dream of Becoming a World-class Metropolis, Crown, 2018,

References

External links
 "National Book Critics Circle Awards announced," Chicago Sun-Times, March 7, 2008

Living people
American literary critics
Critics employed by The New York Times
Year of birth missing (living people)